The 1975 Omaha tornado was a violent tornado that hit the Omaha metropolitan area in the U.S. state of Nebraska. It was part of a two-day outbreak that struck the Midwest and Southern United States on May 6–7, 1975, ending in the very early hours of May 8 across Louisiana. South Dakota, Iowa, Texas, and Mississippi were also struck by several tornadoes. In total, 36 tornadoes touched down across 6 states. The outbreak killed three people, injured 137, and resulted in damages costing $250 million to $300 million.

Confirmed tornadoes

May 6 event

May 7 event

Omaha, Nebraska

During the early afternoon of Tuesday, May 6, 1975, a tornado watch was issued for much of eastern Nebraska. Initial tornado activity started in northeast Nebraska throughout the first half of the afternoon. At around 4:15 PM, a tornado warning was issued for the Omaha area and an F4 tornado touched down about 15 minutes later in Sarpy County, Nebraska. The storm then moved north-east, cutting into Douglas County crossing Interstate 80 (injuring several motorists) and through west-central sections of the city of Omaha. The tornado chopped a path across  of streets and residences, crossing the city's busiest intersection at 72nd & Dodge. Extensive damage occurred along 72nd Street, with numerous homes and apartments severely damaged, along with Creighton Prep School and the United Methodist Church. The Westgate subdivision was devastated, with many homes leveled, and a few that were swept away. The nearby Westgate Elementary School was destroyed. Bergan Mercy Hospital, Lewis and Clark Junior High School, a motel, and several industrial buildings were severely damaged as well. The tornado later lifted in the Benson Park area at 4:58.

In one remarkable instance, First United Methodist Church minister of music Mel Olson spotted the rolling clouds in the sky outside the windows of the room where he was rehearsing a children's choir. He led them to safety below the church building. The building, located at 70th and Cass Streets, was struck and heavily damaged by the twister. The room where the children had been practicing, with three walls of windows, was hit and the glass exploded.

Three people were killed and 133 others were injured. One of the fatalities was a woman who was thrown by the tornado from her home to a backyard four or five houses away. Debris was found miles away. Over 4,000 buildings were damaged and 287 were destroyed. In terms of damage, it was the costliest tornado in American history to that date, with damages costing at least $250 million to $300 million (around $1.7 billion in 2015 dollars), and insurance costs estimated at up to $1.1 billion (in 1975).  It was the third-costliest tornado, behind the Oklahoma City-area F5 tornado on May 3, 1999, and the Wichita Falls, Texas, tornadoes on April 10, 1979, until the Joplin, Missouri EF5 tornado on May 22, 2011. It is now currently the ninth-costliest tornado on record.

See also
List of North American tornadoes and tornado outbreaks

References

External links
 Black Tuesday: May 6, 1975 

F4 tornadoes by date
Omaha,1975-05-06
Tornadoes of 1975
Tornadoes in Nebraska
Natural disasters in Omaha, Nebraska
Omaha Tornado
Omaha Tornado 1975